Weli Oya, is a Sinhalese colony area in Mullaithivu District, Sri Lanka formerly known as Manal Aru. Weli Oya has been affected by the Sri Lankan civil war and government Sinhala colonization programs.

Weli Oya was traditionally known as Manal Aru before the launch of government Sinhala colonization programs and the 1984 Manal Aru massacres, where the Tamil population was progressively driven out. A body of running water moving to a lower level in a channel on land is called Manal Aru in Tamil. It is hemmed between Anuradhapura, Mullaitivu, Trincomalee and Vavunia Districts. It is called the "border village" (s) since the territory north of Weli Oya was previously under the control of the Liberation Tigers of Tamil Eelam.

Today 18 villages in Weli Oya. 3,336 families and 11,189 people living in this settlement division. Majority of them are Sinhalese.

History

Manal Aru

This area was known as Manal Aru. Manal in Tamil means sand, Aru in Tamil means river. A body of running water moving to a lower level in a channel on land is called Manal Aru in Tamil.

A total of 13,288 Tamil families living in 42 villages for generations including Kokkulai Grama Sevakar Division (1516 Tamil families), Kokku –Thoduvai Grama Sevakar Division (3306 Tamil families), Vavunia North Grama Sevakar Division (1342 Tamil families), Other Divisions of Mullaitivu District including Naiyaru and Kumulamunai ( 2011 Tamil families). These Traditional Tamil farming villages interspersed with small and large farms owned by Tamils or held on long lease by Tamil-owned business enterprises.  The lease for 99 years was granted by the government in 1965.  The extent of individual holdings varied from ten to fifty acres.  Business concerns held large farms and 16 of them were a thousand acres and more.  Among the large farms were: Navalar farm, Ceylon Theatres farm, Kent farm, Railway Group Farm, Postmaster Group Farm and Dollar Farm.

Colonization in 1984
Tamil families were living in 42 villages for generations were asked to vacate their homes and farmlands within 48 hours or face eviction by force in case of default. The Military went around these villages in armored trucked and made loud announcement over public address systems mounted on the trucks. The Military also announced the government has cancelled the 99 years lease in respect of the lands given to 14 Tamil entrepreneurs.

Tamil opposition to settlement in the area by Sinhalese led to violence through the Liberation Tigers of Tamil Eelam which attacked the Kent and Dollar Farm settlement at Weli Oya, killing 62.

After settlements inhabited by ethnic Sinhalese near Maduru Oya Basin in Vadamunai, Eastern Province began to encroach on state land creating a controversy the Sinhalese were ejected from the east and resettled along a line from Padaviya to Nedunkerni in the north, in the Mullaitivu district with jungles being cleared and new roads being opened from Padaviya to Dollar Farm, Kumbakarnan Malai, Ariyakundam, Kokkuchchankulam, Kokkuttoduwai and Veddukkan malai. The project was done with the resources and vehicles of the Army, Agrarian Services, Illmenite Corporation, Tobacco Corporation and Petroleum Corporation. Despite its scale the project began suddenly without the knowledge of either the residents or Government Agents of Vavuniya or Mullaitivu including AGAs Land Officers. Further the use of convicts in the project affected nearby villages which were inhabited by Tamils and several crimes ranging from robbery to rape committed by convict workers were reported.

Manal Aru becomes Weli Oya in 1988 - Extra ordinary Gazette notification
The traditional Tamil region known as Manal Aru named as Weli Oya (Manal in Tamil translated into Sinhalese becomes Weli; Aru in Tamil translated into Sinhalese Oya) in Sinhala by an extra ordinary gazette notification dated 16 April 1988. Weli Oya was proclaimed the 26th District of Sri Lanka. Manal Aru was lies north of the Sinhala colonization scheme of Padavia and from 1987, this administrative division was part of Pathaviya and was brought under the Anuradhapura administrative district.

Settlements in the Manal Aru began in 1984 as a dry zone farmer colony under the land Commission, but it was later acquired by the Sri Lanka Mahaweli Economic Agency in 1988 and declared as the Mahaweli ‘L’ zone. The land was officially renamed Weli Oya on April 16, 1988.

Colonisation after 2009
After the defeat of Liberation Tigers of Tamil Eelam, Sri Lanka Mahaweli Authority started to create a colonisation again in Manal Aru area in Weli oya project of the Mahaweli L-zone, which covered the districts of Mullaitivu, Trincomalee, Vavuniya and Anuradhapura. Sinhalese were settled in traditionally Tamil land, given land, money to build homes and security provided by the Special Task Force. Although the scheme covered four districts, administration was handled from the Sinhalese dominated Anuradhapura district. The scheme aroused much anger amongst the Tamils.

Today the majority of the population in the area is Sinhalese.

See also
List of Sri Lankan Civil War battles
List of attacks attributed to the LTTE
List of attacks attributed to the Sri Lankan military
Notable assassinations of the Sri Lankan Civil War
List of civil wars
Tamil Eelam
Self-determination

External links
 Sensitive colonization in Manal Aru (Welioya) area in Mullaithivu district
 Pirapaharan, Chapter 23 by T. Sabaratnam, (Volume 2) Manal Aru becomes Weli Oya
 At Manal Aru ( Weli Oya ) Sinhalese State Ethnically Cleansed Tamils By V.Thangavelu

References

Populated places in Northern Province, Sri Lanka